Colonel Bagshot were an English rock band formed in the late 1960s in Liverpool, England. Originally called "Colonel Bagshot's Incredible Bucket Band", they began as a six-piece, eventually becoming a four-piece. Their final line-up included Brian Farrell (vocals, guitar, stylophone), Ken Parry (vocals, guitar, keyboards), Dave Dover (vocals, bass, keyboard), and Terry McCusker (vocals, drums).
The band released several singles and one studio album (Oh What a Lovely War) in 1971, which included their best-known song, "Six Day War", later remixed in 2002 by DJ Shadow and titled "Six Days" and by Mahmut Orhan in 2018 retitled "6 Days". The song was also sampled by Pusha T in “Just So You Remember,” from 2022’s “It's Almost Dry.”

Discography
Albums
Oh, What a Lovely War (Cadet Concept, 1971)

Singles
"Oh Happy Day" (Disques Vogue, 1969)
"Smile" (Parlophone, 1971)
"Georgia Fireball" (Parlophone, 1971)
"Dirty Delilah Blues" (Polydor, 1972)
"She's My Sun" (Polydor, 1973)

References

English rock music groups
Musical groups from Liverpool